The 1976 Bowling Green Falcons football team was an American football team that represented Bowling Green University in the Mid-American Conference (MAC) during the 1976 NCAA Division I football season. In their ninth season under head coach Don Nehlen, the Falcons compiled a 6–5 record (4–3 against MAC opponents), finished in sixth place in the MAC, and outscored their opponents by a combined total of 292 to 249.

The team's statistical leaders included Mark Miller with 1,839 passing yards, Dave Preston with 989 rushing yards, and Jeff Groth with 598 receiving yards.

Schedule

References

Bowling Green
Bowling Green Falcons football seasons
Bowling Green Falcons football